Frederick Robertson (18 May 1878 – 17 September 1966) was a New Zealand cricketer. He played in eight first-class matches for Wellington from 1897 to 1902.

See also
 List of Wellington representative cricketers

References

External links
 

1878 births
1966 deaths
New Zealand cricketers
Wellington cricketers
Sportspeople from Paris
Immigrants to New Zealand